Daphni may refer to:
 Dan Snaith, Canadian musician
 Dafni (disambiguation), places in Greece